Haplochromis nigricans is a species of cichlid endemic to Lake Victoria where it is known only known with certainty from Entebbe, Uganda, other populations now placed in H. rufocaudalis. Its preferred habitat is shallow waters with rocky substrates.  This species can reach a length of  SL.

References

nigricans
Fish described in 1906
Taxonomy articles created by Polbot